Jan Korte (born 4 November 1956 in Veendam, Groningen) is a Dutch former football player, who played for BV Veendam and Go Ahead Eagles, and later on became a football manager. He coached BV Veendam for three years (2002–2005).

References
 
  Profile
  Transfer to BV Veendam

Living people
1956 births
People from Veendam
Association football midfielders
Dutch footballers
Dutch football managers
SC Veendam players
SC Veendam managers
Eredivisie players
Footballers from Groningen (province)